Manochlamys is a genus of flowering plants belonging to the family Amaranthaceae.

Its native range is Namibia to South Africa.

Species
Species:
 Manochlamys albicans (Aiton) Aellen

References

Chenopodioideae
Amaranthaceae genera